The Conewago Canal, on the west bank of the Susquehanna River below York Haven, Pennsylvania,  south of Harrisburg in York County, enabled late 18th and early 19th century rivercraft to safely bypass rapids at Conewago Falls. Work on the canal of less than  began in 1793 and was completed in 1797. Robert Morris, a Philadelphia financier, organized the project, which was carried out by chief engineer James Brindley, the nephew of a well-known British engineer of the same name. Two lift locks overcame  of elevation between the ends of the canal, and a guard lock blocked unwanted water, particularly during floods. Cargo could go upstream as well as down. A boat going upriver could navigate the canal in 37 minutes compared to the whole day it would take 30 or 40 men to pull it upriver along the bank.

Despite the canal, flow variations limited the use of the river for shipping to a few months each year. In addition, river boat captains disliked paying the toll required to use the privately owned canal. River arks, a kind of boat less susceptible to damage from rocks in the rapids, made it possible to run the rapids and avoid the toll. The Eastern Division of the Pennsylvania Canal, which ran between Columbia and the mouth of the Juniata River, later bypassed this same section of the river.

History
Because of the state's underlying geology, the Susquehanna River and its tributaries above Conewago Falls were more navigable than the lower river. Upstream, keelboats and Durham boats could transport cargo on these streams, but the Susquehanna's last  or so to the Chesapeake Bay were fast, shallow, and rocky. Middletown, on the east bank of the river, and York Haven on the west bank became important flour milling centers because shipping barrels of flour in wagons from the Susquehanna Valley to Philadelphia or Baltimore was less expensive than shipping unmilled loads of wheat. In 1791, the Pennsylvania legislature authorized funds to improve navigation on the Susquehanna River above Columbia to enhance trade to and from Philadelphia. Though privately funded, the Conewago Canal became part of these general plans.

Pennsylvania's plans for east–west trade also included an improved highway, the Philadelphia and Lancaster Turnpike,  of stone and gravel built by a private company in 1794. After 1797, boats could use the Conewago Canal to bypass the rough water and continue to Columbia, where cargoes were unloaded for shipment by wagon. After 1803, improved road went all the way from Columbia to Philadelphia.

See also
 List of canals in the United States

References

External links
 Pennsylvania Canal Society
 American Canal Society
 National Canal Museum

Canals in Pennsylvania
Transportation buildings and structures in York County, Pennsylvania
Canals opened in 1797
1797 establishments in Pennsylvania